The Renfe Class 251 is a class of electric locomotives operated by Renfe in Spain. They are aesthetically and conceptually based on the JNR Class EF66 operated in Japan, but they have many differences in mechanical design and power output, as well as manufacturers.

Technical specifications
The locomotives have a B-B-B wheel arrangement, and are equipped with monomotor bogies, which have switchable gear ratios. Their maximum axle load is 23 tonnes.

History
The locomotives were introduced in 1982. A total of 30 locomotives have been built. They are mainly used on freight services.

References

Footnotes

Further reading

External links

251
Electric locomotives of Spain
Mitsubishi locomotives
Railway locomotives introduced in 1982